The 2011 UST Growling Tigers men's basketball team represented University of Santo Tomas in the 74th season of the University Athletic Association of the Philippines. The men's basketball tournament for the school year 2011-12 began on July 10, 2011 and the host school for the season was Ateneo de Manila University.

The Tigers, who had celebrated their quadricentennial year, finished fourth at the end of the double round-robin eliminations. They won eight games against six losses. They lost to the No. 1-ranked Ateneo Blue Eagles, who had a twice-to-beat advantage in the semifinals.

They had an average winning margin of 8.9 points and an average losing margin of 13.0 points.

They experienced blowout losses twice in the tournament, both during the second round. The first was against Ateneo by 25 points on August 20, and the other was against the NU Bulldogs by 24 points in the last playing date of the eliminations on September 11.

Team captain Jeric Fortuna was chosen Player of the Week by the UAAP Press Corps for the duration of July 14-17. Cameroonian rookie center Karim Abdul was also chosen Player of the Week for August 11-14, and third year guard Jeric Teng got the citation during the week of September 1-4, 2011.

Abdul who was third in the MVP tally with 60.3 statistical points was disqualified from the Mythical team due to a suspension from a game for two unsportsmanlike fouls that he committed in the eliminations. He had a double-double average of 12.1 points and a league-best 11.5 rebounds on top of the 1.5 blocks per game that he amassed in the season.

Roster

Depth chart

Roster changes 
The Tigers shored up on their front line with the arrival of Karim Abdul who immediately made an impact when he led the league in rebounds at the end of eliminations. In Season 73, the team ranked last in rebounds with an average of only 35.4 per game. They also lagged behind in defensive boards with 22.1 and blocks with 2.5 per game averages.

UST was also able to recruit blue chips from the high school ranks, with UST Tiger Cub Kevin Ferrer who was hailed the UAAP Season 73 Juniors MVP and José Rizal University's Louie Vigil, the Juniors MVP of the NCAA in Season 85 coming onboard.

Subtractions

Additions

Schedule and results

Preseason tournaments 

The Filoil Flying V Preseason Premier Cup games were aired on Studio 23.

UAAP games 

Elimination games were played in a double round-robin format. All games were aired on Studio 23 and Balls.

Postseason tournament

UAAP statistics 

|- bgcolor=#ffffdd
| Jeric Teng || 14 || 13 || 29.6 || 59 || 184 || 32.1% || 17 || 74 || 23.0% || 61 || 79 || 77.2% || 4.4 || 2.2 || 0.8 || 0.3 || 2.9 || style=|14.0
|-
| Jeric Fortuna || 14 || 14 || style=|30.1 || 73 || 206 || 35.4% || 26 || 79 || 32.9% || 19 || 23 || style=|82.6% || 4.0 || style=|3.1 || style=|1.3 || 0.0 || 2.3 || 13.6
|- bgcolor=#ffffdd
| Karim Abdul || 13 || 3 || 27.2 || 58 || 129 || 45.0% || 0 || 0 || 0.0% || 41 || 76 || 53.9% || style=|11.5 || 1.4 || 1.0 || style=|1.5 || 3.0 || 12.1
|-
| Kevin Ferrer || 14 || 9 || 27.0 || 30 || 111 || 27.0% || 10 || 56 || 17.9% || 36 || 54 || 66.7% || 5.4 || 1.3 || 0.4 || 0.1 || 2.2 || 7.6
|- bgcolor=#ffffdd
| Chris Camus || 14 || 13 || 27.8 || 40 || 114 || 35.1% || 2 || 7 || 28.6% || 14 || 26 || 53.8% || 7.6 || 1.5 || 1.1 || style=|1.5 || 2.0 || 6.9
|-
| Melo Afuang || 11 || 5 || 20.5 || 30 || 61 || 49.2% || 0 || 0 || 0.0% || 13 || 20 || 65.0% || 4.6 || 0.4 || 0.3 || 0.3 || 0.5 || 5.2
|- bgcolor=#ffffdd
| Kim Lo || 13 || 1 || 10.0 || 14 || 39 || 35.9% || 0 || 0 || 0.0% || 9 || 11 || 81.8% || 2.4 || 0.5 || 0.5 || 0.0 || 1.1 || 2.9
|-
| Eddie Aytona || 1 || 0 || 2.0 || 1 || 1 || style=|100.0% || 0 || 0 || 0.0% || 0 || 0 || 0.0% || 0.0 || 0.0 || 0.0 || 0.0 || 0.0 || 2.0
|- bgcolor=#ffffdd
| Paolo Pe || 14 || 9 || 15.1 || 12 || 39 || 31.0% || 0 || 0 || 0.0% || 1 || 2 || 50.0% || 3.4 || 0.2 || 0.1 || 0.2 || 0.7 || 1.8
|-
| Louie Vigil || 13 || 0 || 5.0 || 7 || 27 || 25.9% || 2 || 6 || style=|33.3% || 1 || 2 || 50.0% || 0.8 || 0.2 || 0.3 || 0.1 || 0.8 || 1.3
|- bgcolor=#ffffdd
| Jon Sheriff || 13 || 0 || 6.5 || 3 || 16 || 18.8% || 0 || 1 || 0.0% || 3 || 4 || 75.0% || 1.2 || 0.8 || 0.2 || 0.0 || 0.7 || 0.7
|-
| Aljohn Ungria || 8 || 1 || 4.4 || 0 || 3 || 0.0% || 0 || 0 || 0.0% || 3 || 6 || 50.0% || 1.5 || 0.0 || 0.1 || 0.0 || 0.4 || 0.4
|- bgcolor=#ffffdd
| Robin Tan || 14 || 0 || 5.9 || 0 || 9 || 0.0% || 0 || 5 || 0.0% || 0 || 0 || 0.0% || 0.9 || 0.5 || 0.2 || 0.0 || 0.8 || 0.0
|-
| Kent Lao || 6 || 2 || 5.2 || 0 || 2 || 0.0% || 0 || 0 || 0.0% || 0 || 2 || 0.0% || 0.7 || 0.0 || 0.0 || 0.2 || 0.7 || 0.0
|- bgcolor=#ffffdd
| Ron Javier || 1 || 0 || 3.0 || 0 || 1 || 0.0% || 0 || 1 || 0.0% || 0 || 0 || 0.0% || 0.0 || 0.0 || 0.0 || 0.0 || 0.0 || 0.0
|-
| Jaypee Sarcia || 0 || 0 || 0.0 || 0 || 0 || 0.0% || 0 || 0 || 0.0% || 0 || 0 || 0.0% || 0.0 || 0.0 || 0.0 || 0.0 || 0.0 || 0.0
|- class=sortbottom
! Total || 14 ||  || 40.4 || 327 || 942 || 34.7% || 57 || 229 || 24.9% || 196 || 304 || 64.5% || 48.3 || 11.9 || 6.1 || 3.9 || 18.3 || 65.2
|- class=sortbottom
! Opponents || 14 ||  || 40.4 || 334 || 916 || 36.5% || 59 || 287 || 20.6% || 193 || 289 || 66.8% || 42.1 || 15.7 || 5.3 || 5.6 || 16.4 || 65.7
|}

Source: HumbleBola

Awards

Notes

References 

2011–12 in Philippine college basketball
UST Growling Tigers basketball team seasons